Maharani Gayatri Devi Girls' School or MGD is located in Jaipur, India and was established by and named after Rajmata Gayatri Devi of Jaipur. It was the first all-girls school to be established in the state of Rajasthan.

History
The school was founded on 12 August 1943. In the summer of 1940, the Maharaja of Jaipur Sawai Man Singh Bahadur brought home Princess  Gayatri Devi, of Cooch Behar, as his bride. She was the daughter of the Maharaja and Maharani Indira Deviji, of Cooch Behar. Her concern for the education of the local court women led her and Bahadur to found the school. Bahadur ordered the Prime Minister Sir Mirza Ismail, and the Education and Finance Minister, Rao Bahadur Amarnath Atal, to allot land and plan the school. It started with 24 girls and Lilian G. Lutter as Principal on the lines of the British public school pattern.

MGD was the first girls' public school to be accepted as a member of the Public School Council of India' Conference (IPSC). In 1950, MGD became a center for the Cambridge Examination for Jaipur. In 1962 the school shifted to the Indian School Certificate Board.

The school follows the Central Board for Secondary Education CBSE curriculum. The founder principal of the school was Ms. L.G. Lutter. The principal of the school is Mrs. Archana S. Mankotia. The school celebrated its 50th anniversary in 2003 with a ceremony for the founder Rajmata Gayatri Devi of Jaipur., Shiv Kumari of Kotah is vice president of the school.

School campus
Today it has over 3000 students from all parts of India of which 400 are resident on campus, studying from Classes I to XII.

The campus consists of buildings, gardens, lawns, sports fields, tennis courts, a stadium cum auditorium and a swimming pool. There are six boarding houses, each for age groups -  Lillian Hurst, Ashiyana, Deepshikha, Maharani Indira Devi Bhawan, Rani Vidya Devi Bhawan, and the teacher's residence - Nivedita House.

Boarding and hostel life

The students are divided in six hostels according to the house they are in. 
Standard 1 to 5 are housed in Lilian Hurst named after the founder principal, Ms. LG Lutter. 
Standard 6 and 7 are in Deepshikha hostel. 
Madame Curie house girls are in Ashiana hostel. 
Florence Nightingale house girls in Vidya Devi Bhawan hostel ground floor. 
Helen Keller house girls in Vidya Devi Bhawan hostel first floor. 
Sarojini Naidu house girls in Maharani Indira Devi Bhawan hostel.
Separate building will be provided for residential teachers in Nivedita.

Houses

The students are divided into four houses named after notable women achievers:
Madame Curie: red,
Helen Keller: blue,
Florence Nightingale: green,
Sarojini Naidu: orange.

Inter-house competitions range from cultural, art and craft activities to music and dance as well as debates and quizzes. In sport, the students participate in inter-house and inter-school sports competitions and represent the city and state at national and international levels.

Sports and extra-curricular activities

MGDians participate in inter-house sports championships such as athletics, basketball, volleyball, swimming, running, badminton, tennis, Hockey competition etc. The girls engage in 13 sports. A sports day with a marching parade and school band is organised annually. MGD hosts the annual IPSC Sports Meet and other inter-school sports competitions.

Notable alumnae

Pamella Bordes – photographer and former Miss India
Sandhya Mridul – actress
Sminu Jindal - entrepreneur
Krishnendra Kaur (Deepa) – former member of Lok Sabha
Meira Kumar – Speaker of the Lok Sabha and presidential candidate for the Union of India from Indian National Congress, 2017

Apurvi Chandela – international shooter

References

Private schools in Rajasthan
Boarding schools in Rajasthan
Girls' schools in Rajasthan
Educational institutions established in 1943
1943 establishments in India
Schools in Jaipur